The Edwin Smith House is an historic structure in Dayton, Ohio. It was added to the National Register of Historic Places on August 13, 1974.  It is also known as the Dayton Bicycle Club and Craighead House.

See also
 National Register of Historic Places listings in Dayton, Ohio

References

National Register of Historic Places in Montgomery County, Ohio
Houses on the National Register of Historic Places in Ohio
Houses in Dayton, Ohio